MV Butiama is a passenger and cargo vessel which is operated by the Marine Services Company Limited of Tanzania since 1980.

History
MV Butiama was built in 1980 as one of the smallest ships.

Revamp
After the ship had stopped its service in 2014, the government spent TSh 4.9 billion to renovate it. In August 2020, the newly revamped Butiama returned to service after a long hiatus and started operating between Mwanza and Nansio on Ukerewe Island. It has the capacity for 180 passengers and 100 tonnes of cargo.

References

1980 ships
Ferries of Tanzania
Passenger ships of Tanzania